Pape Latyr N'Diaye (born 30 November 1977) is a Senegalese former professional footballer who played as a goalkeeper.

Career
Born in Ouakam, N'Diaye began playing club football with local side Entente Sotrac in 1993. He joined AS Douanes in 2002, where he would win three consecutive Senegal FA Cup titles.

N'Diaye signed with US Ouakam in 2006 and captained the side that won the 2006 Senegal FA Cup, and the 2011 Senegal Premier League - the club's first league title in its 60-year history.

N'Diaye did not make an appearance for the Senegal national team, but was called up for a friendly against Benin on 7 February 2007. He was an unused reserve goalkeeper at the 2012 Africa Cup of Nations finals, the only squad member who played in the local league.

References 

Living people
1977 births
Footballers from Dakar
Senegalese footballers
Association football goalkeepers
Senegal international footballers
Senegal A' international footballers
2012 Africa Cup of Nations players
2009 African Nations Championship players
AS Douanes (Senegal) players